The 1998 Russian Indoor Athletics Championships was the 7th edition of the national championship in indoor track and field for Russia. It was held on 13–15 February at the Alexander Gomelsky Universal Sports Hall CSKA in Moscow. A total of 26 events (13 for men and 13 for women) were contested over the three-day competition. It was used for selection of the Russian team for the 1998 European Athletics Indoor Championships.

The Russian Combined Events Indoor Championships was held separately on 13–15 February in Lipetsk at the Jubilee Sports Palace.

Results

Men

Women

Russian Combined Events Indoor Championships

Men

Women

International team selection
Following the results of the championships, taking into account the qualifying standards, the Russian team for the 1998 European Athletics Indoor Championships included:

Men

200 m: Andrey Fedoriv
400 m: Ruslan Mashchenko, Boris Gorban
800 m: Sergey Kozhevnikov
1500 m: Vyacheslav Shabunin†, Andrey Zadorozhnyy
3000 m: Vyacheslav Shabunin†, Sergey Drygin
60 m hurdles: Evgeny Pechonkin
High jump: Vyacheslav Voronin
Pole vault: Vadim Strogalev, Pyotr Bochkaryov, Igor Trandenkov
Long jump: Aleksey Musikhin
Triple jump: Denis Kapustin, Vyacheslav Taranov
Shot put: Pavel Chumachenko
Semibore: Lev Lobodin, Aleksandr Averbukh

Women

200 m: Svetlana Goncharenko, Natalya Voronova
400 m: Irina Rosikhina, Gulnara Safiullina
800 m: Larisa Mikhaylova
1500 m: Olga Komyagina
3000 m: Mariya Pantyukhova, Olga Yegorova
60 m hurdles: Svetlana Laukhova, Irina Korotya
High jump: Yelena Yelesina, Yelena Gulyayeva, Yuliya Lyakhova
Long jump: Tatyana Ter-Mesrobyan
Triple jump: Yelena Lebedenko
Shot put: Irina Korzhanenko, Svetlana Krivelyova†
Pentathlon: Irina Belova, Svetlana Moskalets

† Later withdrew from the international competition

References

Results
На стадионах страны и мира. Чемпионат России // Лёгкая атлетика (статистическая вкладка) : журнал. — 1998. — № 3. — С. 13.
Чен Е. На ринг… возвращаются (Чемпионат России в помещении) // Лёгкая атлетика : журнал. — 1998. — № 1—2. — С. 46—47.
 
 

Russian Indoor Athletics Championships
Russian Indoor Athletics Championships
Russian Indoor Athletics Championships
Russian Indoor Athletics Championships
Sports competitions in Moscow
1998 in Moscow